Agnotozoa is a subkingdom of simple animals. It is one of the four subkingdoms of animals, the others being Eozoa, Parazoa and Histozoa (now known as Eumetazoa). It is nearly synonymous to Mesozoa.

It was first used as one of the branches of the subkingdom Metazoa. It was then considered to contain only one group, Mesozoa.

More recently, some have used the name to refer to a subkingdom of three small phyla of simple animals without organs, Placozoa, Orthonectida, and Rhombozoa. They are known as "simple" though they have differentiated tissue, because that tissue is only organized in simple ways; for example, by being layered. The Orthonectida and Rhombozoa are grouped into the Mesozoa.

Biologists today generally do not use the taxon Agnotozoa because it is doubted that placozoans are closely related to mesozoans and that orthonectids and rhombozoans are related to each other. Even if the two are related, there is little need for another name in addition to mesozoa.

References 

 

Obsolete animal taxa
Subkingdoms